Aidan Coleman (born 17 August 1988) is an Irish National Hunt jockey, who has ridden multiple Grade 1 winners in the United Kingdom including at the Cheltenham Festival.

Career
Coleman was born in Cork, Ireland and moved to England in 2006 working for trainer Henrietta Knight. His first ride was in December of the same year, finishing 9th at Hereford riding Silverbar.  His first victory came the following year onboard Tashkandi at Uttoxeter. Coleman would switch to being the retained jockey with Venetia Williams, and won the 2008/09 champion conditional jockey championship with 55 winners. In April he rode in his first Grand National, onboard Mon Mome, becoming one of the youngest ever jockeys in the race aged 19. He was one of the youngest riders ever to start the Grand National.  The following year, he opted not to ride Mon Mome in the National, instead Liam Treadwell steered the horse to victory at Aintree.

After success with Williams, in 2015, Coleman joined the new Bloomfields racing operation in Newmarket with John Ferguson. It was a brief but successful phase of Coleman's career. Bloomfields lasted just one season, with the horses auctioned by Tattersalls in April 2016.

Coleman secured his first Group 1 success with Paisley Park, a horse trained by Emma Lavelle that took him to victory in the JLT Hurdle, Stayers' Hurdle at the Cheltenham Festival and two Long Walk Hurdle's. In June 2019, Coleman reached the 1,000 career winners mark. Put The Kettle on became another successful horse for Coleman, winning both the Arkle Challenge Trophy and Queen Mother Champion Chase at Cheltenham. Coleman has also had success with Epatante and Jonbon, winning Grade 1 races at Aintree for owner JP McManus. Whilst Coleman rides a number of the Irish owners horses, he is not officially the number one jockey for the billionaire. In 2022, it was announced Coleman would no longer be the retained jockey by trainer Olly Murphy, who he had been attached to since 2020.

Major wins 
 Great Britain
 Aintree Hurdle - (1) -  Epatante (2022) 
 Fighting Fifth Hurdle - (2)- Epatante (2020, 2021 (2021 a dead heat)) 
 Henry VIII Novices' Chase -  Jonbon (2022) 
 Long Walk Hurdle - (3) -  Paisley Park(2018, 2020, 2022)
 Top Novices' Hurdle - (1) - Jonbon (2022)

Cheltenham Festival winners (3) 
 Queen Mother Champion Chase - (1) - Put The Kettle On (2021)
 Stayers' Hurdle -  (1) -Paisley Park (2019)
 Arkle Challenge Trophy - (1) -Put the Kettle On (2020)

Personal life
Coleman lives in Tewkesbury, Gloucestershire. His brother is the Irish National Hunt jockey, Kevin Coleman, who won the 2007 Galway Plate. Between 2009 and 2011, Coleman was sponsored by horse racing television channel Racing UK. He also appeared on the channel as a presenter.
For the 2022-23 season, Coleman is sponsored by Kalooki Sportsbook.

References

1988 births
Living people
Irish jockeys
Lester Award winners